Karl Fleschen (born 28 June 1955 in Daun, Rhineland-Palatinate) is a retired West German runner who specialized in the 3000, 5000 and 10,000 metres.

He held the world record in the rarely contested 4 x 1500 metres relay (14:38.8 minutes with Thomas Wessinghage, Harald Hudak and Michael Lederer). In addition he still holds the German record in 25 km road race, with 1:13:58 hours from 1978.

He competed for the sports clubs LG Vulkaneifel and Bayer 04 Leverkusen during his active career.

Achievements

References

1955 births
Living people
People from Daun, Germany
German male long-distance runners
German male middle-distance runners
Athletes (track and field) at the 1976 Summer Olympics
Olympic athletes of West Germany
Sportspeople from Rhineland-Palatinate
20th-century German people